Jerzy Skarżyński may refer to:
 Jerzy Skarżyński (athlete)
 Jerzy Skarżyński (artist)